The 2014 BB&T Atlanta Open was a professional tennis tournament played on hard courts. It was the 27th edition of the tournament, and part of the 2014 ATP World Tour. It took place at Atlantic Station in Atlanta, United States between 19 and 27 July 2014. It was the first men's event of the 2014 US Open Series.

Singles main-draw entrants

Seeds 

 1 Rankings are as of July 14, 2014

Other entrants 
The following players received wildcards into the singles main draw:
  Robby Ginepri 
  Ryan Harrison 
  Nathan Pasha

The following players received entry from the qualifying draw:
  Steven Diez
  Illya Marchenko
  John-Patrick Smith 
  Michael Venus

The following players received entry as lucky losers:
  Thiemo de Bakker
  Alex Kuznetsov
  Rajeev Ram

Withdrawals 
Before the tournament
  Ivan Dodig
  Richard Gasquet
  Lleyton Hewitt
  Ivo Karlović (fatigue)
  Bradley Klahn
  Gaël Monfils (right knee injury)
  Radek Štěpánek (left harmstring injury)
  Dmitry Tursunov

ATP doubles main-draw entrants

Seeds

1 Rankings are as of July 14, 2014

Other entrants
The following pairs received wildcards into the doubles main draw:
  Robby Ginepri /  Ryan Harrison 
  Korey Lovett  /  Becker O'Shaughnessey

Withdrawals
Before the tournament
  Matthew Ebden

During the tournament
  Ryan Harrison (foot injury)

Finals

Singles 

  John Isner defeated  Dudi Sela, 6–3, 6–4

Doubles 

  Vasek Pospisil /  Jack Sock defeated  Steve Johnson /  Sam Querrey, 6–3, 5–7, [10–5]

External links 
 

BBandT Atlanta Open
Atlanta Open (tennis)
BBandT Atlanta Open
2014 in sports in Georgia (U.S. state)
2014 in Atlanta